Lu Sheng-Yen (born 27 June 1945), commonly referred to by followers as Grand Master Lu (師尊) is the founder and spiritual leader of the True Buddha School, a new religious movement with teachings from Buddhism & Taoism. Lu is known by the sect as Living Buddha Lian Sheng (蓮生活佛, Liansheng Huófó) and is revered by his disciples as a Living Buddha.

Lu Sheng-Yen's sect says that it has five million followers worldwide, of whom the majority hail from Taiwan, Singapore, Indonesia, Malaysia and Hong Kong. There are more than four hundred local chapters of the True Buddha School over the world. He holds dual American and Taiwanese citizenship, and often travels between the two countries.

Lu Sheng-Yen is married to Lian Hsiang, who is also a vajra master, and is referred as Grand Madam Lu in Chinese. Prior to becoming a monk, the couple already had two children.

Life 
Lu Sheng-Yen was born in Chiayi County, Taiwan in 1945. Lu was raised a Christian and attended a Protestant school. He graduated from Chung Cheng Institute of Technology with a degree in Survey Engineering. In his early twenties he was both a survey engineer and a Sunday School Bible teacher. Though his parents were not Christians, he had joined Kaohsiung New Presbyterian Church, in which he became an active member.

In a biography, Lu wrote that his third eye was activated by the Golden Mother of the Jade Pond in 1969, and followed the instructions of Monk Liao Ming (of the Taoist Ching Zhen Sect) and the Three Mountains and Nine Marquis. The Three Mountains is said to represent Dharmakāya (Vairocana Buddha) Sambhogakaya (Locana Buddha), Nirmanakaya (Sakyamuni Buddha) while "Nine Marquis" represents a combination of Buddhas and Bodhisattvas, each corresponding to different directions. They are named to be, Mahavairocana Buddha (Centre), Aksobhya Buddha (East), Ratnasambhava Buddha (South), Amitābha Buddha (West), Amoghasiddhi Buddha (North), Samantabhadra Bodhisattva (South East), Manjushri Bodhisattva (South West), Avalokitesvara Bodhisattva (North West), Maitreya Bodhisattva in the (North East).

He then actively practiced Taoism, Geomancy, Sutrayana and Vajrayana Buddhism, through which he cited that a mystical experience led him to seek twenty-one human gurus in Taoism, Sutra, and Tantra. In 1982, Lu and a small following of his disciples moved to the United States, settling in the state of Washington.

Lu Sheng-Yen is a prolific writer who has authored two hundred and eighty-five (as of June 2021) Chinese books. His books have also been translated into Japanese, English, Portuguese, Vietnamese, Bahasa Indonesia, Spanish and other languages. All these books have been made available to read for free online. Lu's paintings have also been compiled into nine volumes. Prior to the internet, his sermons were recorded into various formats and distributed worldwide. His weekly ceremonies are now broadcast live on YouTube in Chinese with realtime English translation.

He went into retreat for six years in late 2000, spending most of his time in Tahiti, and to a lesser extent in Taiwan. Today he predominantly lives in Taiwan and Redmond, Washington. In a sermon, he told his disciples that he aspires to never abandon any sentient being.

Teachings 
Lu Sheng-Yen teaches the Mahamudra method of attaining Buddhahood. His teachings contain the traditional stages of the practice of the Four Preliminaries, followed by Guru Yoga, Deity Yoga, the Vajra Practices, and finally Highest Yoga Tantra. Lu has lineages from Chinese Buddhism, & all four major schools of Tibetan Buddhism, namely Nyingma, Kagyu, Sakya, and Gelug, though instruction is imparted in Chinese, translations, including into English, are almost always available. Lu's documented spiritual gurus include the Monk Liao Ming, the 16th Karmapa Rangjung Rigpe Dorje, Dezhung Rinpoche, and Tai Situ Rinpoche among others.

He says he is an emanation of Padmakumara, which he explains, is itself a transformation body of Amitabha Buddha.

Lu's teachings are made available to lay practitioners, & Vajrayana practices are open to those who have taken refuge, provided they have received the appropriate empowerment for each practice (& completed preliminary requirements), not just to those who live a monastic life, & thus the consumption of meat is not prohibited for his disciples, though bardo deliverance of the animal's soul is practiced prior to consumption. For monks and nuns, alcohol consumption is prohibited, & the usual Buddhist vows regarding good conduct are observed. All practitioners are expected to closely adhere to the teachings of Shakyamuni Buddha (Gautama Buddha) & observe the 14 root vows (samaya) of Vajrayana Buddhism.

In an interview from Taiwanese media in 2010, he explained: "In Tantric Buddhism, we don't differentiate if a disciple wants to consume vegetables or meat. If a disciple wants to consume vegetables, we let her consume vegetables. If a disciple is not willing to consume meat, it is convenience. For those ordained (monks, nuns, etc) if able to consume vegetables, then we always try our best to consume vegetables. If he cannot consume vegetables, it is also convenience. But this convenience is also different. Because there is a difference of Theravada and Tantric in Buddhism, tantric masters or monks firstly have to make offering of the food they consume to the buddhas and bodhisattvas. Secondly, they also have to salvage the spirits of those they consume and cleanse their spirits to pure lands or higher realms. So for tantric buddhism, there are ways to convert the spirits we consume to a better places or realms for their good before we consume. However, for theravada buddhism, they emphasize we do not consume meat. But for tantric, because we have a method of salvation, we are able to consume meat. The most important precept is we must not witness the slaughtering or hear the slaughtering or slaughter animals for our desire as a guest. According to Buddha, this is known as "three cleansed meat" or 3 types of cleansed meat."

Lu is said to be the first person to hold the Adharma Buddha and Mahottara Heruka (the wrathful emanation or the other side of Adharma Buddha) ceremony on a large scale to benefit the sentient beings. Before this first ceremony in 2015, there is no information on the mantra of Adharma Buddha or Mahottara Heruka. In Sutrayana, Adharma Buddha is called Samantabhadra Tathagata and also "Dorje Chang". In other English translated version, it is known as Adi Buddha. Grandmaster Lu explained: "Adharma Buddha is a 16th-ground buddha and extremely venerable. Adharma Buddha has said that as long as one receives his empowerment, learns his practice, and attains spiritual union with him, one is sure to attain buddhahood within seven lifetimes. He is the highest. There is none higher than him. There is another point. Once you have received the empowerment of this deity you will never again reincarnate into the three evil realms (three lowest realms in six mundane realms). Adharma Buddha is the primordial buddha, the original buddha. He is primordial and original. In Buddhism he is supreme, the most venerable, the highest and the most sacred. He is the most saintly and the greatest. By praying to or supplicating this deity it is certain that your prayers will be granted. All buddhas, all bodhisattvas, all deities, dakinis and protectors are emanations of Adharma Buddha."

Controversies 

Lu made headlines during an investigation by the Washington State Public Disclosure Commission, prompted by media reporting, into a collective cash donation to then-Governor Gary Locke after a speaking engagement at the Ling Shen Ching Tze Temple. Lu hoped Locke might eventually run for the White House. Locke was cleared of any wrongdoing by the commission in 1998. Further, this did not affect Locke in his pursuit for confirmation as U.S. Secretary of Commerce.

Lu and the Ling Shen Ching Tze Temple Seattle were sued unsuccessfully in civil court by a former Malaysian immigrant disciple over an allegation of sexual misconduct while living in the temple dormitories. The King County, Washington prosecutor declined to file charges for lack of evidence. The case was dismissed by King County Superior Court Judge Kathleen Learned citing constitutional issues. In the case S.H.C. v. Sheng-Yen Lu, the Court of Appeals of Washington, Division 1, granted the Temple's motion for summary judgment, and the Court of Appeals later "affirm[ed] the order granting summary judgment of dismissal to the Temple."

Of the incident, Lu said:

Notes

See also
List of Buddha claimants

References 
 Lu, Sheng-yen (1995). A Complete and Detailed Exposition on the True Buddha Tantric Dharma. San Bruno, CA: Purple Lotus Society.

External links 
 
 

1945 births
Living people
Buddhist writers
Taiwanese Buddhists
American Buddhists
American people of Taiwanese descent
Converts to Buddhism from Protestantism
People from Redmond, Washington
Female Buddhist spiritual teachers
People from Chiayi County